Desirée Cormier Smith is the Special Representative for Racial Equity and Justice for the United States State Department. Her appointment was announced on June 17, 2022 by United States Secretary of State Antony Blinken. She is tasked with fighting against systemic racism around the world.

Cormier Smith is the first person ever appointed to the office.

References

Living people
Year of birth missing (living people)
Place of birth missing (living people)